Chlorochroa saucia is a species of stink bug in the family Pentatomidae. It is found in North America.

Characteristics 
Adult chlorochroa saucia can grow to be 9 mm long.

References

Articles created by Qbugbot
Insects described in 1832
Pentatomini